Tretten Church is a parish church of the Church of Norway in Øyer Municipality in Innlandet county, Norway. It is located in the village of Tretten. It is the church for the Tretten parish which is part of the Sør-Gudbrandsdal prosti (deanery) in the Diocese of Hamar. The white, wooden church was built in a cruciform design in 1728 using plans drawn up by the architect Jens Skank. The church seats about 300 people.

The central tower was removed because of damage in 2000 and placed next to the church.

History
The first known church in Tretten was a stone long church that was likely built during the second half of the 13th century. (It is possible that there was a wooden post church on the site before the stone church, but there is no concrete evidence of this.) By the mid-1500s, the old stone church was in poor condition, so between 1586-1588 a new wooden long church was built right next to the old stone church.

It was decided at that time to build a new church on a new site, near the new main road. The lead builder was Jens Skanke, the son-in-law of the local parish priest Christian Wolfgang Monrath. The new church was built in 1727-1728 and it was a wooden cruciform building. Some of the stone from the medieval church was reused in the foundation of this new building. The new church was consecrated on 12 September 1728.

Originally, the church had not tower, just a square base with a pyramid shaped roof on top. In 1774-1775, the church was tarred on the outside and a new slate roof was installed. In 1807, the church exterior was painted red and a tower was installed on the roof. Already in 1819, the tower was having structural problems preventing the ringing of the bell. Many attempts at fixing the tower took place over the years. In 1875, the church exterior was painted white and a couple years after this, the slate roof was replaced with a new slate roof and a zinc top was installed on the tower. Again in 1968, the tower was repaired again to reinforce the structure, but this did not last very long. In 1999-2000, the tower had significant rot damage so the tower had to be removed. The old tower was taken down and installed on the ground adjacent to the church. The tower was not replaced until 2015 when a smaller, more modest tower was installed.

Media gallery

See also
List of churches in Hamar

References

Øyer
Churches in Sør-Gudbrandsdal Deanery
Churches in Innlandet
Cruciform churches in Norway
Wooden churches in Norway
18th-century Church of Norway church buildings
Churches completed in 1728
13th-century establishments in Norway